The 1992–93 UCLA Bruins men's basketball team represented the University of California, Los Angeles in the 1992–93 NCAA Division I men's basketball season. The Bruins began the season ranked 24th in the AP Poll. The team finished 3rd in the conference.  The Bruins competed in the 1993 NCAA Division I men's basketball tournament. The UCLA Bruins beat Iowa State in the first round, 81-70, and lost to Michigan in the second round, 84-86.

Roster

Schedule

|-
!colspan=9 style=|Preseason NIT

|-
!colspan=9 style=|Regular Season

|-
!colspan=9 style=| NCAA tournament

Source

Starting lineup

Other players: C George Zidek (Fr), Ike Nwankwo, Kevin Dempsey, Rodney Zimmerman, David Boyle, Mike Lanier, Marquis Burns, Steve Elkind

References

UCLA Bruins men's basketball seasons
Ucla
Ucla
NCAA
NCAA